Hull Public Schools is a school district in Hull, Massachusetts. It has three schools: Jacobs Elementary School, Memorial Middle School, and Hull High School.

In 2009 the district was experiencing a budget shortfall due to difficulties in the economy. That year the district ended middle school Spanish, but the district added back Spanish instruction the following year. As of 2015 Spanish remains the sole foreign language offered by the district. That year Kathleen Tyrell, the superintendent, stated that the district does not have enough financial power to offer any foreign languages other than Spanish.

References

External links
 Hull Public Schools

School districts in Massachusetts
Education in Plymouth County, Massachusetts
Hull, Massachusetts